The women's modern pentathlon at the 2008 Summer Olympics in Beijing was held on Friday, August 22. Three venues were used: Olympic Green Convention Center (shooting and fencing), Ying Tung Natatorium (swimming), and the Olympic Sports Center Stadium (horse-riding and running).

Lena Schöneborn of Germany won the gold medal in the women's event, with a score of 5,792 points. Meanwhile, Heather Fell claimed Great Britain's first ever silver medal, and fourth overall in the women's event. Victoria Tereshchuk of Ukraine won the nation's first ever Olympic medal in modern pentathlon, taking the bronze, but was subsequently stripped of the medal after a doping re-test.

Competition format
The modern pentathlon consisted of five events, with all five held in one day.

 Shooting: A 4.5 mm air pistol shooting (the athlete must hit 20 shots, one at each target). Score was based on the number of shots hitting at each target.
 Fencing: A round-robin, one-touch épée competition. Score was based on winning percentage.
 Swimming: A 200 m freestyle race. Score was based on time.
 Horse-riding: A show jumping competition. Score based on penalties for fallen bars, refusals, falls, and being over the time limit.
 Running: A 3 km run.  Starts are staggered (based on points from first four events), so that the first to cross the finish line wins.

Schedule
All times are China Standard Time (UTC+8)

Results

References

External links
 NBC Olympics – Official Results & Schedule

W
2008 in women's sport
Women's events at the 2008 Summer Olympics